Pati Parmeshwar, also called Majazi Khuda, is a concept in South Asia that teaches that the husband is akin to a deity, being next to God. This teaching of Pati Parmeshwar or Majazi Khuda holds that it is the husband's role to provide for his wife. Indian and Pakistani women thus regularly pray and fast for their husband. For a South Asian married couple, the husband is viewed by his wife as an aid in her eventual salvation with respect to the afterlife. The concept of Pati Parmeshwar or Majazi Khuda originates in Hinduism, though it has been adopted by many practitioners of Islam in the Indian subcontinent.

See also 
Ganga-Jamuni tehzeeb
Hindu-Muslim unity

References 

Indian culture
Pakistani culture
Hindu theology
Islam in India